Lobatse Airport  is an airstrip serving Lobatse, a town in the South-East District of Botswana. There is a ridge between the town and airstrip that parallels the runway.

See also

Transport in Botswana
List of airports in Botswana

References

External links
OpenStreetMap - Lobatse
OurAirports - Lobatse
Fallingrain - Lobatse Airport

Airports in Botswana